Melani García (born 10 June 2007) is a Spanish singer. She won La Voz Kids in 2018 and represented Spain at Junior Eurovision Song Contest 2019 held on 24 November in Gliwice, Poland with the song "Marte", placing third.

Career

La Voz Kids
In May 2018, Melani won the fourth season of La Voz Kids in her country.

Breakthrough
On 29 June 2018, Melani released her first single "Vivo por ella", the Spanish version of Andrea Boccelli's 1997 hit "Vivo per lei". In 2019 she released a second single, a cover version of "’O sole mio". Melani has also been a cast member for the stage show We Love Queen, where she performed the Freddie Mercury and Montserrat Caballé song "Barcelona".

Junior Eurovision Song Contest 2019

She was announced as the Spanish entrant on 24 July 2019 during the talk show A partir de hoy, hosted by Máximo Huerta and aired on La 1.

Her entry's title, "Marte", and a preview of the song were released to the public on 20 September 2019. The song, written and produced by Pablo Mora alongside Manu Chalud, was released in full on 4 October 2019. She was accompanied on stage by Idurne Rodriguez, Yara Díez, Violeta Leal, and María Mihali. The scenography of the stage was made by Santiago Junegos. At the contest in Gliwice Arena, Poland, she placed 3rd with 212 points.

She later released "Adios" and "Grita Conmigo" in 2020. Melani collaborated with American actress and singer, Aubrey Miller, for "Singing Alone" in 2021.

Baqytty Bala
Garcia represented Spain in Kazakh children’s music festival, Baqytty Bala. The televised festival, created by Dimash Kudaibergen, featured Kazakh children as well as international representatives, and the winner would earn the right to represent Kazakhstan at the Junior Eurovision Song Contest 2022. Garcia progressed to the third and final round, where she placed 2nd after David Charlin.

Discography

Guest appearances

References

External links

 
 

2007 births
Living people
Child pop musicians
Opera crossover singers
Spanish child singers
Spanish sopranos
Spanish-language singers
Spanish people of Argentine descent
Singers from the Valencian Community
People from Camp de Túria
Junior Eurovision Song Contest entrants
The Voice Kids contestants
21st-century Spanish singers
21st-century Spanish women singers